No. 26 Squadron of the Royal Air Force was formed in 1915 and was disbanded for the last time in 1976.

The squadron's motto is N Wagter in die Lug (Afrikaans) (A guard in the sky), and the badge is a springbok's head couped.

History

1915 to 1918
No. 26 Squadron was formed at Netheravon on 8 October 1915 from personnel of the South African Air Corps. It was equipped with B.E.s and Farmans and sent to East Africa in 1915, arriving in Mombasa at the end of January 1916. In February 1918 it was dispatched back to the UK where it was disbanded in July 1918.

Between the wars
On 11 October 1927, No. 26 was reformed at Catterick as a single flight of Armstrong Whitworth Atlas army co-operation aircraft; on 1 September 1928 a second flight was added. In July 1933 Hawker Audaxes were received, which were replaced by Hawker Hectors in August 1937.

Second World War
By the outbreak of the Second World War, the Squadron had been equipped with Westland Lysanders and in October 1939 it was moved to France. When the Germans invaded Belgium in May 1940, No. 26 was forced to move to Lympne where it flew reconnaissance, bombing and supply missions over northern France. Coastal patrols began in June and training with the army occupied most of the Squadron's time for the next few years. In February 1941 Curtiss Tomahawks began to arrive to replace the Lysanders for tactical reconnaissance missions. In October 1941 the Tomahawks began to fly low-level ground attack sorties over northern France but they lacked the performance required for operations of this nature, so in January 1942 they were replaced by North American Mustangs. The tactical reconnaissance and day intruder missions continued until July 1943, when the Squadron moved to Yorkshire and then in March 1944 to Scotland. In preparation for the Normandy landings, No. 26 trained in spotting naval guns, a task it carried out on and after D-Day. For this role the Squadron was equipped with Supermarine Spitfires although they reverted to Mustangs in December 1944 for reconnaissance missions over the Netherlands. In April 1945 the Squadron spent two weeks spotting for French warships bombarding pockets of German resistance before being transferred to Germany in August. No. 26 remained here until 1 April 1946 when it was disbanded.

Post war

On the same day, No. 41 Squadron was renumbered as No. 26 Squadron at Wunstorf and flew Spitfires and Hawker Tempests until April 1949, when it was re-equipped with de Havilland Vampires. In November 1953, now at RAF Oldenburg, No. 26 was converted to Sabres, converting again to Hunters in July 1955, and remained a day-fighter unit until it was disbanded on 10 September 1957. It was reformed with Hawker Hunters at RAF Gutersloh on 7 June 1958 but was disbanded again on 30 December 1960. Reformed again at RAF Odiham on 1 June 1962, No. 26 became a helicopter squadron flying Bristol Belvederes. An advance party was moved to Aden in March 1963 and the remainder to RAF Kuching, Borneo in November 1963 for a one-year unaccompanied tour. The aircraft remaining in RAF Khormaksar in 1965 went to Singapore on 30 November 1965 where they were merged with No. 66 Squadron RAF, the ground crew going to No. 74 Squadron. 

On 3 February 1969 the Training Command Communications Squadron at RAF Wyton (formerly the Northern Communications Squadron) was re-designated No. 26 Squadron. It was equipped with a mixture of Beagle Bassets and Percival Pembrokes, with the role of providing communication aircraft support to RAF Training Command. The squadron discarded its Pembrokes in March 1971, receiving de Havilland Devons in July that year. The squadron's Bassets were retired in May 1974, leaving it to continue on with Devons until it was disbanded on 1 April 1976.

See also 
List of Royal Air Force aircraft squadrons

References

Sources

External links

026
Military units and formations established in 1915
026 Squadron
1915 establishments in England